Julian Flügel (born 18 April 1986) is a German long distance runner who specialises in the marathon. He competed in the men's marathon event at the 2016 Summer Olympics where he finished in 71st place.

References

External links
 

1986 births
Living people
German male long-distance runners
German male marathon runners
Athletes (track and field) at the 2016 Summer Olympics
Olympic athletes of Germany
People from Fulda
Sportspeople from Kassel (region)
21st-century German people
20th-century German people